Glenea quinquevittata is a species of beetle in the family Cerambycidae. It was described by Per Olof Christopher Aurivillius in 1926 and is known from the Philippines.

Subspecies
 Glenea quinquevittata fuscotibialis Breuning, 1964
 Glenea quinquevittata quinquevittata Aurivillius, 1926

References

quinquevittata
Beetles described in 1926